Homeobox protein Meis2 is a protein that in humans is encoded by the MEIS2 gene.

This gene encodes a homeobox protein belonging to the TALE ('three amino acid loop extension') family of homeodomain-containing proteins. TALE homeobox proteins are highly conserved transcription regulators, and several members have been shown to be essential contributors to developmental programs. Multiple transcript variants encoding distinct isoforms have been described for this gene.

References

Further reading

External links 
 

Transcription factors